The Solomon Islands Rugby Union Federation, or SIRUF, is the governing body for rugby union in Solomon Islands. It was established in the 1960s, but only became fully affiliated to the International Rugby Board (IRB) in 1999.

The Solomon Islands Rugby Union Federation is a full member of the Federation of Oceania Rugby Unions (FORU), which is the regional governing body for rugby in Oceania.

Programs and affiliates
SIRUF programs include 15-a-side and 7-a-side rugby competitions in Honiara and the Provinces, a women’s tag rugby competition, as well as high school and junior rugby competitions. The SIRUF has eight affiliated associations or member unions:

 Honiara Rugby Union Association (HRUA) 
 Bellona Rugby Union Association (BRUA)
 East Rennell Rugby Union Association (ERRUA)
 West Rennell Rugby Union Association (WRRUA)
 Malaita Rugby Union Association (MRUA) 
 Rugby Union Makira Association (RUMA)
 Western Rugby Union Association (WRUA)
 Solomon Islands Rugby Referees Association (SIRRA)

National teams

The Solomon Islands 15s national team, the Warriors, has not yet played in a world cup but has competed at the South Pacific Games (as it was called up to 2003), and more recently at the FORU Oceania Cup. Solomon Islands fields teams in 7s competitions as well as 15s. The national women's 7s team was established in 2012.

See also
 Solomon Islands national rugby union team
 Solomon Islands national rugby union team (sevens)
 Solomon Islands women's national rugby union team (sevens)
 Rugby union in Solomon Islands

External links
 Solomon Islands on IRB.com
 Solomon Islands on OceaniaRugby.com

Reference list

1966 establishments in the United Kingdom
Sports organizations established in 1966
Rugby union in the Solomon Islands
Organisations based in the Solomon Islands
Rugby union governing bodies in Oceania